Jorge Enrique Cruz-Cruz (born January 24, 1966) is a former Colombian footballer and current scout/coach who played professionally for clubs in Colombia and Argentina. He holds a United States United States Soccer Federation A Coaching License with a NSCAA National Goalkeeper License, a Brazilian B License, and an Asian Football Confederation A License. Cruz currently coaches the Central Texas Lobos FC of the Gulf Coast Premier League and has served the United States Soccer Federation on the Development Academy and Olympic Development sides.

College career

Professional career

Cruz began to develop at Deportivo Cali in his native Colombia before moving to Houston, Texas, USA to pursue an indoor soccer career. He was lured back to Colombia and featured for Racing de Córdoba in 1989/90 amassing 6 goals in 24 games. Cruz went on short stints with both Independiente Santa Fe and Chaco For Ever impressing in the National B which led to a transfer to Huracán in 1992 where Cruz went on to score 25 goals in 65 matches. This fine form caught the attention of the managers of Colombia (Francisco Maturana) as well as USA (Bora Milutinović), but Cruz was unable to squeeze into a position at the World Cup 1994 for either nation. A short spell followed at Quilmes from 1994-95 (B Nacional, 8 matches, 2 goals) before Cruz returned to the USA to pursue a career in coaching.

Cruz, often referred to by the double last name 'Cruz-Cruz' was a barreling, right-footed forward who was also good in the air. He is endeared at Huracán for not only an exciting goal-scoring race of 1993 with Alberto Acosta but also helping the team to a runner-up finish in the 1994 Clausura. Cruz's made a common practice of thanking God for goals and good performances.

Coaching career

Cruz has been a United States Soccer Development Academy Scout since 2008 and also an Assistant Coach for the U14, U15, and U17 USA Girls National Teams.
Cruz served as an Assistant Coach of the Jordan Women's National Team under Michael Dickey from 2017-2018.
Cruz worked as a Professional Match Evaluator for Major League Soccer from 2010-2017 and has been on the Olympic Development Program staff since 2005.

References

External links
 
 Futbolistas Extranjeros profile
 Houston Baptist profile

1966 births
Living people
Colombian footballers
Colombian expatriate footballers
Club Atlético Banfield footballers
Quilmes Atlético Club footballers
Club Atlético Huracán footballers
Chaco For Ever footballers
Independiente Santa Fe footballers
Argentine Primera División players
Expatriate footballers in Argentina
Association football forwards
Colombian expatriate sportspeople in the United States
Colombian expatriate sportspeople in Argentina
Expatriate soccer players in the United States
Expatriate football managers in Jordan
Expatriate soccer managers in the United States
Houston Christian Huskies men's soccer players
Colombian expatriate football managers